Gharbi, meaning western, may refer to:

Places
 Gharbi, Afghanistan, village in Afghanistan
 Gharbi, Iran, village in Iran
 Gharbi, Tunisia, south island off the Tunisian coast
 Gharbi Rural District, in Ardabil Province, Iran
 Hodh El Gharbi Region, Mauritania
 Mangowal Gharbi, village in Punjab, Pakistan

People
 Ismaël Gharbi, French footballer
 Marc Lépine (born as Gamil Rodrigue Liass Gharbi; 1964-1989), Canadian mass murderer
 Seer Gharbi, Union Council in NWFP, Pakistan

See also
 Al Gharbiyah (disambiguation)
 Western (disambiguation)